The Inachos, also known as Panitsa (Πάνιτσα), is a river in the Peloponnese, southern Greece. Its source is in the mountains of western Argolis, near the village Kaparelli. It flows into the Aegean Sea in Nea Kios. The Inachos was named after Inachus, a mythical king of Argos, who introduced civilization to the area.

The Inachus rises, according to Pausanias (ii 25.3, 8.6.6), in Mt. Artemisium, on the borders of Arcadia, or, according to Strabo (viii. p.370), in Mt. Lyrceium, a northern offshoot of Artemisium. Near its sources it receives a tributary called the Cephissus, which rises in Mt. Lyrceium (Strab. ix. p.424; Aelian, Ael. VH 2.33.) It flows in a south-easterly direction, E. of the city of Argos, into the Argolic gulf. This river is often dry in the summer. Between it and the city of Argos is the mountain-torrent named Charadrus, which also rises in Mt. Artemisium, and which, from its proximity to Argos, has been frequently mistaken for the Inachus by modern travellers. It flows over a wide gravelly bed, which is generally dry in the summer, whence its modern name of Xerias, or the Dry River. It flows into the Inachus a little below Argos. It was on the banks of the Charadrus that the armies of Argos, on their return from military expeditions, were obliged to undergo a court of inquiry before they were permitted to enter the city. (Thuc. 5.60; comp. Paus. 2.25.2; Leake, Morea, vol. ii. p. 364, Peloponnesiaca, p. 267; Mure, vol. ii. p. 161.)

References

Sources 
 William Smith. Dictionary of Greek and Roman Geography (1854). s.v. Argos 

Rivers of Greece
Landforms of Argolis
Rivers of Peloponnese (region)
Drainage basins of the Aegean Sea